Daniel Ruge (May 13, 1917 – August 30, 2005) was an American neurosurgeon. He served as Physician to the President under Ronald Reagan from 1981 to 1985.

Early life 
Ruge was born in Murdock, Nebraska. He received his undergraduate degree from North Central College in Naperville, Illinois. He studied medicine at Northwestern University, receiving his Doctorate in 1945. Later, he advanced his studies in surgery at Northwestern University, where he began working with Loyal Davis, stepfather of Nancy Reagan.

Career 
Ruge became a professor of surgery at Northwestern University Medical School, and Chief of Staff and Chairman of Neurosurgery at Northwestern Memorial Hospital.

In 1976, Ruge relocated to work for the Veterans Administration in Maryland. He was serving with the spinal cord injury service when Reagan appointed him Physician to the President, where he oversaw Reagan's treatment after he was shot.

He died of a ruptured aortic aneurysm on August 30, 2005, at age 88, in Denver, Colorado.

References

1917 births
2005 deaths
American neurosurgeons
Physicians to the President
North Central College alumni
Northwestern University alumni
Northwestern University faculty